The Pacific Tigers men's basketball team represents the University of the Pacific. They are an NCAA Division I member, part of the West Coast Conference. The team is based in Stockton, California. They play their home games at the Alex G. Spanos Center and are led by head coach Leonard Perry.

On July 15, 2013, Pacific left the Big West Conference to rejoin the West Coast Conference. It had been a charter member of the WCC since 1952, but left in 1971 to join the Pacific Coast Athletic Association, later renamed to the Big West Conference.

In late 2015, investigations into improper academic benefits being provided to basketball players began. On December 11, the school placed head coach Ron Verlin and assistant coach Dwight Young on suspension. On December 18, the school self imposed a postseason ban for 2016 and a reduction in scholarships due to the pending academic fraud investigations. On March 3, 2016, the school revealed that Verlin and Young were no longer employed by the university. 

On March 15, 2016, Pacific hired 13-year NBA veteran and 1996 NBA Rookie of the Year Damon Stoudamire as head coach.

Postseason

NCAA Tournament Results
The Tigers have appeared in nine NCAA Tournaments. Their combined record is 4–10.

NIT Results
The Tigers have appeared in one National Invitation Tournament. Their record is 0–1.

CIT Results
The Tigers have appeared in three CollegeInsider.com Postseason Tournaments. Their combined record is 8–3.

Notable players

Retired numbers

Pacific has retired five jersey numbers.

West Coast Conference Player of the Year awardees
 Leroy Wright (1958)
 Leroy Wright (1959)
 Keith Swagerty (1966)
 Keith Swagerty (1967)
 John Gianelli (1971)

Big West Conference Player of the Year awardees
 Ron Cornelius (1979)
 Michael Olowokandi (1998)
 Miah Davis (2004)
 David Doubley (2005)
 Christian Maråker (2006)

References

External links